Garden Point Airport  is located at Pirlangimpi, on the west coast of Melville Island, in the Northern Territory, Australia.

Airlines and destinations

See also
 List of airports in the Northern Territory

References

External links
 

Airports in the Northern Territory